Lee Hye-kyung (born 13 March 1963) is a South Korean sport shooter who competed in the 1988 Summer Olympics.

References

1963 births
Living people
South Korean female sport shooters
ISSF rifle shooters
Olympic shooters of South Korea
Shooters at the 1988 Summer Olympics
Shooters at the 1990 Asian Games
Asian Games medalists in shooting
Asian Games bronze medalists for South Korea
Medalists at the 1990 Asian Games
20th-century South Korean women
21st-century South Korean women